Li Mingyuan is the name of:

 Li Mingyuan (businessman)
 Li Mingyuan (politician)